The 1999–2000 I-Divisioona season was the 26th and final season of the I-Divisioona, the second level of Finnish ice hockey. The second-level Finnish league became the Mestis for the 2000–01 season. 12 teams participated in the league, and Kärpät Oulu, Vaasan Sport, and Diskos Jyväskylä qualified for the promotion/relegation round of the SM-liiga.

Regular season

Playoffs

Final round
 Vaasan Sport - Jää-Kotkat Uusikaupunki 2:0 (3:1, 4:3)
 JoKP Joensuu - KooKoo 2:1 (2:0, 2:4, 5:2)
 Diskos Jyväskylä - FPS Forssa 2:1 (3:0, 2:7, 3:0)
 TuTo Hockey - Hermes Kokkola 2:1 (3:2, 0:1, 3:1)

Second round
 Vaasan Sport - JoKP Joensuu 2:0 (5:1, 2:1)
 Diskos Jyväskylä - TuTo Hockey 2:1 (6:2, 3:7, 5:1)

Relegation 
 Mikkelin Jukurit - SaPKo Savonlinna 3:2 (2:6, 1:6, 5:2, 4:1, 4:0)
 Ahmat Hyvinkää - Kiekko Vantaa 1:3 (3:9, 9:2, 3:6, 2:6)

External links 
 Season on hockeyarchives.info

I-Divisioona seasons
Fin
2